

Gerrit Hiemstra (born 19 August 1961) is a Dutch meteorologist and weather presenter. Since 1998 he is one of the weather presenters for the Dutch public news broadcaster NOS Journaal.

Awards
In 2021 Hiemstra received the :nl:Machiavelliprijs, a Dutch prize awarded annually to politicians or organisations for outstanding achievement in the field of public communication.

See also
 List of meteorologists

References

External links
 
 
 

1961 births
Living people
Dutch television presenters
Dutch meteorologists
Dutch radio presenters
Weather presenters
Television meteorologists
People from Drachten
20th-century Dutch people